Red's Giant Hamburg is a restaurant on U.S. Route 66 in Springfield, Missouri, which is believed to have been the world's first drive-through restaurant. It reopened in 2019.

Overview

Sheldon "Red" Chaney (May 20, 1916 – June 2, 1997) arrived in Springfield after World War II with a bride and a business degree. He purchased a small Sinclair gas station with several wooden motor court cabins tucked among trees on the back of the property. Eventually, a café was added in 1947. Growing weary of pumping gas and operating the motor court, the couple decided a better money-maker would be a restaurant. Since they owned a small herd of beef cattle (and would continue to raise their own beef until the close of the business), they decided to concentrate on hamburgers. The restaurant became a staple of Route 66 and the Springfield area until its closure in 1984. Red died in 1997 a few days after the restaurant was demolished, and Julia died in the early 2000s

Sign recreation
In 2013, a fundraising campaign was established to recreate the Red's Giant Hamburg sign. The sign was installed in 2015.

Reopening
In early 2019, the Springfield Business Journal announced that Red's Giant Hamburg would be making a comeback 35 years after the original restaurant's closure. The new restaurant, located on Route 413, will be a recreation of the original Route 66 location. The project is being led by David Campbell, the owner of local BBQ chain Buckingham's, and insurance agent Greg Lott. The restaurant opened in August 2019.

In popular culture

In 1982, Springfield rock and roll band The Morells filmed their tribute song "Red's" at the location of the restaurant.

See also

 List of hamburger restaurants

References

External links
"Red's Giant Hamburg sizzled with food, fun, heart", Overstreet, Sarah, in (Springfield, MO) News-Leader, May 27, 2006
The Morells video filmed at Reds circa 1982
Red's, the First Drive-thru 
Recreating the Red's Sign on Springfield's Route 66
Join the campaign to save the Red's sign 
Red’s Giant Hamburg making a comeback 

Buildings and structures on U.S. Route 66
Hamburger restaurants
Tourist attractions along U.S. Route 66
Restaurants in Missouri
U.S. Route 66 in Missouri
Demolished buildings and structures in Missouri
Culture of Springfield, Missouri
Buildings and structures in Springfield, Missouri
Restaurants established in 1947
1947 establishments in Missouri
Buildings and structures demolished in 1997